"Wondering" is a popular song written by Jack Schafer  and recorded by Patti Page .

The recording by Patti Page was released by Mercury Records as catalog number 71101. It first reached the Billboard magazine charts on June 3, 1957. On the Disk Jockey chart, it peaked at #12; on the composite chart of the top 100 songs, it reached #35. The flip side was "Old Cape Cod."

References

Patti Page songs
1957 songs
1957 singles
Mercury Records singles